Shenyang railway station is a railway station on the Shenyang–Dalian railway, Shenyang–Dandong railway, Shenyang–Shanhaiguan railway, Huanggutun railway, Shenyang–Fushun intercity railway, Harbin–Dalian high-speed railway and Beijing–Shenyang high-speed railway. It is located in Heping District, Shenyang, Liaoning, China.

History
Fengtian station opened in 1899. The new station building was constructed on October 1, 1910. Fengtian station was renamed Shenyang South Station in 1945 (after Second Sino-Japanese War). Shenyang South Station was renamed Shenyang Station in 1950.

See also

Chinese Eastern Railway
South Manchuria Railway
South Manchuria Railway Zone
Shenyang Metro
Shenyang North railway station

References

Railway stations in Liaoning
Railway stations in China opened in 1899
Stations on the Beijing–Harbin Railway
Transport in Shenyang
Buildings and structures in Shenyang